Ian Scott Kaye (born 19 August 1969) is an Australian Liberal National politician who was the member of the Legislative Assembly of Queensland for Greenslopes from 2012 to 2015.

References

Liberal National Party of Queensland politicians
1969 births
Living people
Members of the Queensland Legislative Assembly
21st-century Australian politicians